Agnathosia mendicella is a moth of the family Tineidae. It was described by Michael Denis and Ignaz Schiffermüller in 1775. It is found from Scandinavia south to Italy and from Germany east to Poland and Romania. It is also present in Russia.

The wingspan is 10–13 mm. Adults are on wing from June to August.

References

 "Agnathosia mendicella (Denis & Schiffermuller, 1775)". Insecta.pro. Retrieved December 11, 2017.

Moths described in 1775
Moths of Europe
Meessiinae